Dinkelscherben station is a railway station in the municipality of Dinkelscherben, located in the Augsburg district in Bavaria, Germany. It is located on the Ulm-Augsburg railroad line and on the disused Dinkelscherben-Thannhausen line. The trains are operated by DB Regio Bayern.

Services 
As of the December 2020 timetable change, the following services stop at Burgau (Schwab):

 : hourly service between Ulm Hauptbahnhof and München Hauptbahnhof.
  : hourly service between Dinkelscherben and München Hauptbahnhof.

References

External links 

 

 Dinkelscherben station – Deutsche Bahn

Railway stations in Bavaria
Buildings and structures in Augsburg (district)